The Winter Park Express is a passenger train operated by Amtrak on winter weekends between Denver Union Station and Winter Park Resort, Colorado. The scenic  route uses the same line as the California Zephyr, climbing  into the Front Range and passing through 30 tunnels—including the historic  Moffat Tunnel under the Continental Divide—before dropping passengers within  of Winter Park's ski lifts. Trains run on Friday, Saturday and Sunday from January to March.

The route, formerly known as the Ski Train was started by the Denver and Rio Grande Western Railroad (better known simply as the Rio Grande) when the ski area opened in 1940. Ansco Investment Company ran the Ski Train from 1988 to March 2009, when service was canceled due to mounting costs. Amtrak revived the route in January 2017, after several sold-out special event trains in 2015 showed popular demand.

History

1940–1988: Rio Grande operation 
The Denver and Rio Grande Western Railroad started the Ski Train in 1940.

There was one trip in each direction per day, with a travel time of 2 hours and 15 minutes, assuming no delays from freight rail traffic.

In the 1960s, 22-car trains to Winter Park were regularly moving an estimated 1,800 passengers, many of them young, unsupervised and sometimes rowdy. On one trip, a youngster pulled the emergency brake on a moving train, damaging one coach's coupler and steam line. After the incident, the railroad hired three sheriff's deputies to patrol the train.

At least during the early 1970s, the train made a stop in the Rocky Flats area.

1988–2009: Ansco Investment Company operation 

In 1988 the operation was sold to Ansco Investment Company, which made various needed improvements and ran the “New Ski Train” for two decades under the reporting mark SKTX.

In this era the Ski Train consisted of three locomotives pulling fourteen cars: eight coaches, three club cars, two cafe lounge cars, and one retreat car. The train accommodated 750 passengers.

On January 21, 2006, the return trip was canceled after a coal train derailment blocked the line, leaving some 700 passengers stuck in Winter Park. Buses were summoned to provide return transportation to Denver, and refunds offered to those who made alternate arrangements. Just two months later, on March 19, another freight train derailment delayed the return Ski Train for almost six hours, with the train arriving in Denver around midnight. 

In 2007, a blizzard forced cancellation of service on December 29 and 30.

The Ski Train made its final run to Winter Park on March 29, 2009. It had been burdened with escalating costs such as liability insurance coverage, operational conflicts with freight traffic, and substantial uncertainties posed by the redevelopment of Denver's Union Station. Combined with the global financial crisis, it was no longer feasible to operate the Ski Train.

The equipment was sold to the Algoma Central Railway, a subsidiary of Canadian National Railway. Ironically, the Ski Train'''s cars had been originally built in 1968 by Hawker Siddeley for use on CN's Tempos. The F40PH locomotives and most passenger cars were refurbished and repainted to Algoma Central's livery and are now in use on the railway's Agawa Canyon tourist train.

 2009: Iowa Pacific Holdings revival bid
Iowa Pacific Holdings (IPH), a holding company that owned railroad properties across North America and the United Kingdom (including San Luis & Rio Grande in southern Colorado), made a bid to revive the Ski Train using idle equipment from SL&RG's subsidiary, Rio Grande Scenic Railroad. Plans fell through due to Amtrak, who would be supplying staff, classifying the Ski Train as a commuter operation instead of an excursion train, resulting in higher liability insurance. Iowa Pacific sued Amtrak, with Amtrak agreeing to settle the matter on December 23, 2009, five days prior to the first day operations were to commence (December 27), with a payment to Iowa Pacific. Full refunds were made by IPH to customers who purchased tickets.

 2015–present: Amtrak Winter Park Express 

In February 2015, Amtrak, Winter Park Resort and the Union Pacific Railroad announced that a special one-day-only "Winter Park Express" train would run on Saturday, March 14, in celebration of the 75th anniversary of Winter Park. With tickets priced at $75, all 400 seats sold out within 12 hours. By popular demand, a second train was added for Sunday, March 15, and it also sold out quickly.

With demonstrated enthusiasm for the excursion train, there were renewed hopes that the Ski Train would again operate seasonally from the recently redeveloped Denver Union Station public transit complex.  In April, Amtrak and Winter Park officials met to begin work on a proposal to track owner Union Pacific for running at least two trips weekly between January and March 2016. Ultimately the negotiations were unable to make the service happen in 2016, but all groups continued to meet into the new year.

In August 2016, Amtrak and its partners announced regular Winter Park Express weekend service from January through March 2017. In its first full season, the Winter Park Express ran 25 trips and saw 18,000 passengers, about 30% of which were non-skiers. The train suffered one major service disruption on March 11, 2017, when a freight train derailment forced the cancellation of the Saturday run. 

After a successful first season, expanded service was announced for the 2017–18 season, including first-Friday round trips and lower ticket prices for some departures. Amtrak added a  Superliner Sightseer lounge and café car to the train for the 2018–19 season, featuring food and drink service along with floor-to-ceiling views. This upgrade had been the "biggest request" from riders. For the 2019–20 season, Winter Park's 80th, service was added on every Friday.

In March 2020, the Winter Park Express was suspended during a round of Amtrak service reductions in response to the COVID-19 pandemic. The train did not run in the 2020–21 season. Amtrak reported total ridership of nearly 70,000 from the train's introduction in 2017 through to the 2020 service suspension.

In November 2021, Amtrak and Winter Park Resort announced that service would return for the 2021–22 season. The train ran on its 2019 schedule, with Friday, Saturday, and Sunday service from mid-January through early April.

The 2023 season is scheduled to run for eleven weekends starting on January 13, 2023.

Future plans
In June 2021, Colorado created a district to advance Front Range Passenger Rail, a proposed train service between Pueblo, Colorado Springs, Denver, Boulder, and Fort Collins. The legislation specifically calls for interconnectivity with the Winter Park Express. Rail advocates have seen the Winter Park Express as a springboard for building interest in Front Range service.
Route

There are no intermediate stops. This is the highest railroad tunnel in the United States and the third-longest, after the Cascade Tunnel in Washington state and the Flathead Tunnel in Montana.

On weekdays and during the off-season, riders can still reach Winter Park via Amtrak's long-distance California Zephyr. This daily train follows the same route from Denver but does not stop directly at Winter Park Resort's platform. Instead, riders can disembark several miles down the track at Fraser–Winter Park station, where transit buses operated by the city's "The Lift" service connects to the resort. Travelers thus have two train options to travel between Denver and Winter Park on days when the Winter Park Express'' is running.

See also
List of Colorado historic railroads

References

External links

Amtrak–Winter Park Express
Winter Park Resort–Winter Park Express

Passenger rail transportation in Colorado
Transportation in Denver
Denver and Rio Grande Western Railroad
History of Colorado
Railway services introduced in 1940
Railway services discontinued in 2009
Amtrak routes